Earls Common is a village in Worcestershire, England. Villages nearby include Himbleton and Stock Green.

Villages in Worcestershire